Luís Caldas (17 December 1926 – 30 June 2012) was a Portuguese wrestler. He competed in the men's Greco-Roman middleweight at the 1960 Summer Olympics.

References

External links
 

1926 births
2012 deaths
Portuguese male sport wrestlers
Olympic wrestlers of Portugal
Wrestlers at the 1960 Summer Olympics
Sportspeople from Lisbon